The Heart of Sarajevo (Bosnian, Croatian and Serbian: Srce Sarajeva / Срце Сарајева) is the highest prize awarded in all the competition categories at the Sarajevo Film Festival.

Heart of Sarajevo
The official Heart of Sarajevo have been awarded since 2004, and the 10th anniversary of the Sarajevo Film Festival.
Its design, as a visual identity for the festival, was chosen in 2004 from the shape that has been in informal circulation since the very beginning of the festival in the early 1990s, a heart designed by French fashion designer Agnès Andrée Marguerite Troublé a.k.a. Agnès B., a friend and patron of the Sarajevo Film Festival.

Heart of Sarajevo Award for Best Feature Film

Heart of Sarajevo Award for Best Director

Heart of Sarajevo Award for Best Actress

Heart of Sarajevo Award for Best Actor

Heart of Sarajevo Award for Best Short Film

Heart of Sarajevo Award for Best Student Film

Heart of Sarajevo Award for Best Documentary Film

Honorary Heart of Sarajevo Award
Since 2005, the Honorary Heart of Sarajevo has been also awarded to individuals who have contributed to the development of the festival, as well as regional film in general, term which comprise filmmaking in broad area of Former Yugoslavia, Balkans, and Southeast Europe. In 2016, the Honorary Heart of Sarajevo Award for lifetime achievement was introduced. Its first recipient was Robert De Niro.

See also
Sarajevo Film Festival
Golden Bear award at the Berlin International Film Festival
Silver Bear and other awards at the Berlin International Film Festival
Palme d'Or, the highest prize awarded at the Cannes Film Festival
Golden Lion, the highest prize awarded at the Venice Film Festival

References

External links
 Sarajevo Film Festival (SFF homepage)
 IMDb - Sarajevo Film Festival, SFF at Internet Movie Database

Sarajevo Film Festival
International film awards
Awards for best film
Bosnia and Herzegovina film awards